Mukabuye, also known as Bukabuye, is a ward in Muhambwe Constituency in Kibondo District of Kagera Region in Tanzania. In 2016 the Tanzania National Bureau of Statistics report there were 9,189 people in the ward. Prior to 2014 the ward was a village in the Itaba Ward.

Villages / neighborhoods 
The ward has 10 hamlets.

 Gwanumpu
 Kabuye
 Kageyo
 Kasagwe
 Kumwayi
 Mugalika
 Murugunga
 Murusange
 Nyakilenda
 Nyampfa

References

Kibondo District
Constituencies of Tanzania